Samuel Seo (born May 3, 1991) is a South Korean singer-songwriter, rapper, and record producer. Born in Seoul, he spent his youth living in his home country, as well as Japan, the United States, and Canada. An aspiring pianist, Seo's exposure to hip hop music in his teens led him to pursue the genre. He released a series of singles before enlisting and serving two years in military service.

Seo released his first studio album Frameworks (2015), which earned him the award for Best R&B & Soul Album at the Korean Music Awards in 2016. He released his second album Ego Expand (100%) in May of that year, which earned him nominations for Best R&B & Soul Album, as well as Best R&B & Soul Song for its lead single "B L U E". As a solo artist, Seo released one of his most recent albums, "My Body and My Heart", which garnered awards for Best R&B and Soul Album. This was followed by a new release of his third album, the fourth volume of his book Eros, which garnered an award for Best Book.

Life and career

1991–2012: Early life and career beginnings
Samuel Seo was born Seo Dong-hyeon on May 3, 1991, in Seoul, South Korea. He began to learn to play the piano between the ages of four and five. His father, who worked for the Japanese company Hitachi at the time, was transferred to Tokyo; this resulted in Seo and his family moving to Japan at the age of five. He was enrolled in kindergarten there, where he spent the following two to three years in the country and learned to speak Japanese. Throughout his remaining youth and adolescence, he lived in the United States and Canada. He learned English in the former between visiting family and studying at a community center. He attended and graduated middle school in Canada, where he sought to become a lawyer.

Upon returning to South Korea to attend high school, Seo began to focus on becoming a pianist. While exploring his university options, he entered a club and heard "Outta Control" by American rapper 50 Cent, his first experience with hip hop music. Impressed by the genre, the exposure led him to pursue it. He came across Bigdeal's "Deal with Us", his first time listening to Korean hip hop. During this time period, the Bigdeal Squads collective was holding auditions; after successfully auditioning, Seo was signed to the record label in 2008 and became part of the collective. Unsatisfied with his given birth name, Seo chose his stage name after the biblical Samuel: "His words became truths and people took them as sacred. I liked that position. I mean, not sacred, but I hope people hear my words seriously." In spite of his name, he identifies as irreligious. Encompassing ambient, electronic, and new-age music, Seo released his first single "Raindrop" in 2010. The following year, he released his first mixtape Now or Never before being subject to conscription in South Korea and enlisting in military service.

2013–2016: Frameworks and Ego Expand (100%)
Seo completed his military service and was discharged in 2013. A member of the New Block Babyz and Guereallaz collectives, he released his debut extended play Welcome to My Zone in October of that year. The singles "Vibe" and "Ocean of You" followed in the subsequent months. After a year and a half hiatus, Seo released "New Dress Girl" on September 14, 2015, in precedence of his first full-length album. Contributing to the songwriting, composing, and arrangement on the record, as well as playing all instruments with the exception of bass, Frameworks was released on October 2. The album earned Seo the award for Best R&B & Soul Album at the 13th annual Korean Music Awards.

Seo released the digital single "Kafka" on February 17, 2016. Influenced by Franz Kafka's novel The Metamorphosis, the song is a collaboration with rapper Verbal Jint. He released his second studio album Ego Expand (100%), along with its lead single "B L U E" on May 27. After holding a showcase for the album, he embarked on his first series of concert tours in Asia. On October 28, he released the post-album single "Float" featuring C Jamm. Seo was nominated for Best R&B & Soul Album and Song, respectively, for the 14th Korean Music Awards for Ego Expand (100%) and "B L U E".

2017–present: Collaborative works
Seo released a collaboration single with former 4Minute member Jeon Ji-yoon in March 2017. On June 8, he released the collaborative project extended play Elbow with Qim Isle.

Musicianship
Due to his extensive involvement in his music, Seo has been referred to as a "genius artist". In addition to singing and rapping, he contributes to the songwriting, composition, arrangement, and production of his material. He also incorporates various genres into his work, including R&B, soul, hip hop, funk, electronica, and synthpop. He has been complimented on his "unique style".

Discography

Albums

Studio albums

Extended plays

Singles

As lead artist

As featured artist

Soundtrack appearances

Guest appearances

Filmography

Variety show

Awards and nominations

Korean Music Awards

! 
|-
| 2016
| Frameworks
| rowspan="2"|Best R&B & Soul Album
| 
| align="center"|
|-
| rowspan="2"|2017
| Ego Expand (100%)
| 
| align="center" rowspan="2"|
|-
| "B L U E"
| rowspan="2"|Best R&B & Soul Song
| 
|-
| 2018
| "Off You"
| 
| align="center"|
|}

References

External links
 

1991 births
21st-century South Korean  male singers
Electronica musicians
Korean Music Award winners
Living people
South Korean male singer-songwriters
Rappers from Seoul
South Korean contemporary R&B singers
South Korean hip hop singers
South Korean male rappers
South Korean record producers